Veauchette is a commune in the Loire department in the Auvergne-Rhône-Alpes region in central France.

Population

See also
Communes of the Loire department

References

External links
 City website

Communes of Loire (department)